Benito Skinner (born November 3, 1993) is an American comedian and actor. He is known for his online persona Benny Drama, and performs celebrity impression, skits, and original characters on platforms such as Instagram, YouTube, and TikTok.

Early life and education 
Skinner was born and raised in Boise, Idaho, and attended Bishop Kelly High School. While a senior in high school, Skinner founded the nonprofit OATHS, which stands for Organization Assisting the Homeless Student, and was recognized at the 2011 National Philanthropy Day Idaho. He also played on Bishop Kelly's football team as a wide receiver.

Some of his early comedic inspirations were Robin Williams in his role as Mrs. Doubtfire, and SpongeBob SquarePants. While he would perform renditions of Britney Spears and Destiny's Child songs for his family, he has discussed repressing some of his early proclivities toward performance and comedy due to bullying and homophobic comments.

He went on to attend Georgetown University in Washington, D.C., where he studied acting, English, and film and media studies. In college, Skinner began experimenting with performance in the form of recorded lip syncs and other videos. He had created the @BennyDrama7 Instagram account in high school — with the "7" referencing his football jersey number — but only began to post comedic videos while in college.

While at Georgetown, Skinner was also the co-creator and host of BEAT$, a weekly campus radio show known for its pop music stylings.

Career 
After graduating, Skinner worked as a video editor while continuing to create online content. In 2016, Skinner made his social media accounts public, and this early work developed into comedy videos on Instagram, TikTok and YouTube. He is known for his celebrity impressions such as Shawn Mendes, Lana Del Rey, and Kourtney Kardashian, as well as for original characters such as Jenni the Hairdresser. He has described his work as fully rooted in pop culture.

In 2018, he performed his debut show "Overcompensating" at Carolines on Broadway to a sold-out audience at the New York Comedy Festival. He hosted the pop culture podcast "Obsessed" with Mary Beth Barone on Spotify for one season and 50 episodes.

Personal life 
Skinner is gay, and came out in his senior year of college. He lives with his boyfriend, director Terrence O'Connor, in Los Angeles, California. They are known for their elaborate and carefully constructed annual couples' Halloween costumes.

Filmography

References

External links 
 

1993 births
Living people
21st-century LGBT people
American gay actors
American LGBT comedians
American male comedians
American sketch comedians
Gay comedians